Paccelis Morlende (born 19 April 1981) is a French basketball coach for U-17 team of the Hermine de Nantes Atlantique of the LNB Pro B and a former professional basketball player.

Professional career
Morlende's career started with JDA Dijon, where he spent his career prior to being drafted by the Philadelphia 76ers with the 50th overall pick in the 2003 NBA Draft. He was traded on draft day to the Seattle SuperSonics for Willie Green and cash considerations. Morlende played his entire professional basketball career overseas, averaging 7.9 points per game with JDA Dijon.

With his retirement in 2017, Morlende became 1 of 11 players from the 2003 NBA Draft to never play a game in the league during his professional basketball career.

Coaching career
Morlende coached Hermine de Nantes Atlantique U-17 team and brought the team to final of Coupe de France U17 in 2018, but lost in final to JL Bourg Basket U-17 team.

References

External links
NBA.com: Prospect Profile: Paccelis Morlende
NBADraft.net profile - Paccelis Morlende

1981 births
Living people
ASVEL Basket players
BCM Gravelines players
CB Valladolid players
French expatriate basketball people in Italy
French expatriate basketball people in Spain
French men's basketball players
HTV Basket players
JDA Dijon Basket players
JL Bourg-en-Bresse players
Liga ACB players
Pallacanestro Treviso players
PBC Ural Great players
People from Creil
Philadelphia 76ers draft picks
Point guards
Roseto Sharks players
Sportspeople from Oise